The 1977 Baltimore Orioles season was a season in American baseball. It involved the Orioles finishing tied for second in the American League East with a record of 97 wins and 64 losses.

Offseason 
 November 1, 1976: Darryl Cias was released by the Orioles.
 November 5, 1976: 1976 MLB expansion draft
Bob Galasso was selected from the Orioles by the Seattle Mariners.
Dave Pagan was selected from the Orioles by the Seattle Mariners.
 December 15, 1976: Bob Babcock was traded by the Orioles to the Texas Rangers for Dave Criscione.
 January 11, 1977: John Shelby was drafted by the Orioles in the 1st round (20th pick) of the 1977 Major League Baseball Draft.
 January 20, 1977: Paul Blair was traded by the Orioles to the New York Yankees for Elliott Maddox and Rick Bladt.
 February 8, 1977: Billy Smith was signed as a free agent by the Orioles.
 February 11, 1977: Vic Rodriguez was signed as an amateur free agent by the Orioles.

Regular season

Season standings

Record vs. opponents

Opening Day lineup

Notable transactions 
 May 26, 1977: Randy Stein was acquired from the Orioles by the New York Yankees.
 June 13, 1977: Dyar Miller was traded by the Orioles to the California Angels for Dick Drago.
 July 27, 1977: Ken Rudolph was purchased by the Orioles from the San Francisco Giants.
 September 19, 1977: Nelson Briles was purchased by the Orioles from the Texas Rangers.

Roster

Player stats

Batting

Starters by position 
Note: Pos = Position; G = Games played; AB = At bats; H = Hits; Avg. = Batting average; HR = Home runs; RBI = Runs batted in

Other batters 
Note: G = Games played; AB = At bats; H = Hits; Avg. = Batting average; HR = Home runs; RBI = Runs batted in

Pitching

Starting pitchers 
Note: G = Games pitched; IP = Innings pitched; W = Wins; L = Losses; ERA = Earned run average; SO = Strikeouts

Other pitchers 
Note: G = Games pitched; IP = Innings pitched; W = Wins; L = Losses; ERA = Earned run average; SO = Strikeouts

Relief pitchers 
Note: G = Games pitched; W = Wins; L = Losses; SV = Saves; ERA = Earned run average; SO = Strikeouts

Awards and honors 
 Earl Weaver, Associated Press AL Manager of the Year

Farm system

See also 
 Forfeit (baseball) – the Orioles forfeited their September 15 game against the Toronto Blue Jays

References

External links 

1977 Baltimore Orioles team page at Baseball Reference
1977 Baltimore Orioles season at baseball-almanac.com

Baltimore Orioles seasons
Baltimore Orioles season
Baltimore Orioles